MTV Unplugged is a live album by the American rock band Pearl Jam. Originally recorded on March 16, 1992 for the MTV television series MTV Unplugged, it was released to the public on October 23, 2020. Initially, it was given a limited release in November 2019 as part of Record Store Day on limited edition vinyl, it is the first time that the band's MTV Unplugged performance has been released on both vinyl and CD.

Track listing

Charts

References

External links

2019 live albums
MTV Unplugged albums
Pearl Jam live albums
Record Store Day releases